Premia (Walser German: Saley) is a comune (municipality) in the Province of Verbano-Cusio-Ossola in the Italian region Piedmont, located about  northeast of Turin and about  northwest of Verbania, on the border with Switzerland.

Premia borders the following municipalities: Baceno, Bosco/Gurin (Switzerland), Campo (Vallemaggia) (Switzerland), Crodo, Formazza, Montecrestese.

Premia is a thermal spa town.

Demographic evolution

References

Cities and towns in Piedmont